Joan Goodnick Westenholz (1 July 1943 – 2013) was an Assyriologist and the chief curator at the Bible Lands Museum in Jerusalem. She held positions related to academic research at the Oriental Institute (University of Chicago), Harvard University, Ruhr University Bochum (Germany), New York University, Princeton University, and the W. F. Albright Institute of Archaeological Research at Jerusalem. She was one of the first people to research gender studies in relation to the Ancient Near East and she co-founded and edited the inter-disciplinary NIN – Journal of Gender Studies in Antiquity.

Early life and education
Westenholz was born in 1943 in Philadelphia and attended the University of Pennsylvania, where she graduated at the age of 21 with a degree in anthropology. She completed her PhD in Near Eastern Languages and Literatures from the University of Chicago in 1971 and studied under Erica Reiner, A. Leo Oppenheim, I. J. Gelb, and Miguel Civil.

References

University of Pennsylvania alumni
1943 births
2013 deaths
University of Chicago alumni
Scientists from Philadelphia
American archaeologists
American women archaeologists
21st-century American women